GPSI may refer to:
 GTP diphosphokinase, an enzyme
 General Purpose Serial Interface